India International University of Legal Education and Research of Bar Council of India Trust at Goa, India is an international university which is planned to be constructed.

This institute will be funded and run by the Bar Council of India. Once established, the university will also operate the International Arbitration Centre and it will be the first international Arbitration centre in India and the second in Asia after Singapore International Arbitration Centre. On December 19, 2021, the foundation stone was laid by PM Narendra Modi.

References

Arbitration organizations